Enchanté (lit. 'Who is Enchanté?') is a 2022 Thai romantic comedy-drama television series starring Kasidet Plookphol (Book) and Jiratchapong Srisang (Force). Based from the novel of the same name by NinePinta.

Directed by Pawis Sowsrion (Film) and produced by GMMTV. Enchanté was introduced as one of GMMTV's "GMMTV 2021: The New Decade Begins" event on 3 December 2020. However, it officially premiered on  January 28, 2022 on GMM 25, every Friday at 20:30 IST (8:30pm).

Synopsis
Theo (Kasidet Plookphol) suddenly moved to France during childhood to live with his grandmother, when his grandmother died, he moved back to Thailand. Theo meets his childhood friend and neighbour Akk (Jiratchapong Srisang) who welcomes him back and helps Theo settle in. Theo joins the University that his father owns, majoring in Literature. Due to Theo's father owning the university, Theo is already popular as he joins.

One day, Theo finds a book in the University library, Theo writes a message in the book, not expecting a response. When Theo opens the book the next time, an anonymous responder signs themselves as 'Enchanté' meaning 'Nice to meet you' in French. Theo becomes curious of who 'Enchanté' may be. Akk puts posters around the university to help Theo find out who 'Enchanté' is. Four male university students come forward claiming they are 'Enchanté', Saifa (Gawin Caskey), Natee (Pusit Disthapisit), Wayo (Tharatorn Jantharaworakarn) and Phupha (Thanaboon Kiatniran).

Will Theo, with the help of Akk, find out who the anonymous 'Enchanté' is?

Cast and characters

Main 
Kasidet Plookphol (Book) as Theo
Jiratchapong Srisang (Force) as Akk

Supporting
Gawin Caskey (Fluke) as Saifa
Pusit Disthapisit (Fluke) as Natee
Tharatorn Jantharaworakarn (Boom) as Wayo
Thanaboon Kiatniran (Aou) as Phupha
Chayakorn Jutamas (JJ) as Ton
Napat Patcharachavalit (Aun) as Tan
Nalinthip Phoemphattharasakun (Fon) as Im
Keetapat Pongruea (Pleng) as Egg
Narumon Phongsupan (Koy) as Amphawa
Oliver Poupart (An) as Dr. Thamrong
Jitaraphol Potiwihok (Jimmy) as Sun
Yongwaree Anilbol (Fah) as Fon

Soundtrack

Reception

Thailand television ratings 
In the table below,  represents the lowest ratings and  represents the highest ratings.

 Based on the average audience share per episode.

References

External links 
 GMMTV

Television series by GMMTV
2020s LGBT-related comedy television series
2020s LGBT-related drama television series
2022 Thai television series debuts
GMM 25 original programming
Thai boys' love television series
Thai romantic comedy television series